Cumnock Juniors Football Club are a Scottish football club based in Cumnock, Ayrshire.

The Nock play their home games at Townhead Park and compete in the West of Scotland Football League.

History
Birthed in 1912, they have a history of local and national success. Their nearest neighbours and rivals are Auchinleck Talbot. Both have shared many a hard-fought battle on the field.
These matches are often looked upon as Junior football's equivalent to the "Old Firm" with passionate supporters from both sides.

In the 1970s and 1980s this game would often attract a crowd of around 6000; although it has dwindled a bit over the years, the respect and rivalry is still noticeable. A Scottish Junior Cup tie between the two sides in the mid-1970s attracted well over 8000 spectators. Cumnock won 2–1.

A "senior" team based in Cumnock also competed in the 19th century and participated in the early years of the Scottish Cup. Cumnock Juniors play in black and white. Their change strip is white and blue.

From December 2018 until late 2019, the team was managed by local boy and former Queen of the South midfielder, Paul Burns.

Tony McInally has been the manager of the club since November 2019.

In 2020, Cumnock moved from the SJFA, to join the pyramid system in Scottish football as one of the inaugural members of the West of Scotland Football League.

On 10 October 2020, the club announced they would not be participating in the inaugural season of the West of Scotland League due to concerns relating to the COVID-19 pandemic. The two main factors cited were the health and wellbeing of players under the guidelines and fans not being able to attend games.

Current squad

Coaching staff

Honours

Scottish Junior Cup
Winners: 1978–79, 1988–89
 Runners-up: 1949–50, 2007–08

Other honours
 Ayrshire Cup (7): 1915–16, 1917–18, 1948–49, 1980–81, 1989–90, 2007–08, 2009–2010
 Ayrshire District Cup (5): 1971–72, 1983–84, 1986–87, 1989–90, 2002–03
 Ayrshire First Division winners (11): 1935–36, 1936–37, 1952–53, 1971–72, 1973–74, 1980–81, 1981–82, 1983–84, 1984–85, 1995–96, 1997–98
 Ayrshire League Cup (15): 1936–37, 1948–49, 1952–53, 1966–67, 1970–71, 1976–77, 1978–79, 1983–84, 1984–85, 1985–86, 1986–87, 1995–96, 1996–97, 2000–01, 2001–02
 Ayrshire Second Division winners: 1994–95
 Ayrshire Super Cup: 1988–89, 1995–96, 1996–97
Cumnock & Doon Cup: 1986–87, 1987–88, 1988–89
East Ayrshire Cup: 1995–96

References

External links 
 

 
Football clubs in Scotland
Scottish Junior Football Association clubs
Association football clubs established in 1912
Football in East Ayrshire
1912 establishments in Scotland
West of Scotland Football League teams
Cumnock